Dalcerides rebella is a moth in the family Dalceridae. It was described by Schaus in 1911. It is found in Costa Rica and Ecuador. The habitat consists of tropical wet and premontane wet forests.

The length of the forewings is 7 mm. The forewings and thorax are yellow orange, while the remainder is pale yellow. Adults are on wing in February, March, May and July.

References

Moths described in 1911
Dalceridae